Sensorial transposition is a technique used in remote reality to transfer the perception of one sense to another, or where a user receives feedback through a different sense unexpectedly. For example, a thermographic camera allows us to have a visual sensation of the temperature, which is atypical thermoception.

References 

Virtual reality